The Kingdom of Saudi Arabia is an Islamic absolute monarchy in which Sunni Islam is the official state religion based on firm Sharia law. Non-Muslims must practice their religion in private and are vulnerable to discrimination and deportation. While no law requires all citizens to be Muslim, non-Muslim foreigners attempting to acquire Saudi Arabian nationality must convert to Islam. Children born to Muslim fathers are by law deemed Muslim, and conversion from Islam to another religion is considered apostasy and punishable by death. Blasphemy against Sunni Islam is also punishable by death, but the more common penalty is a long prison sentence. According to the U.S. Department of State's 2013 Report on International Religious Freedom, there have been 'no confirmed reports of executions for either apostasy or blasphemy' between 1913 and 2013.

Religious freedom is virtually non-existent. The government does not provide legal recognition or protection for freedom of religion, and it is severely restricted in practice. As a matter of policy, the government guarantees and protects the right to private worship for all, including non-Muslims who gather in homes for religious practice; however, this right is not respected in practice and is not defined in law.

The Saudi Mutaween, also known as the Committee for the Promotion of Virtue and the Prevention of Vice (CPVPV) or "religious police" was enforcing the prohibition on the public practice of non-Muslim religions, though its powers were significantly curtailed in April 2016. Sharia applies to all people inside Saudi Arabia, regardless of religion.

Religious demography
The country’s total land area is about 2,150,000 sq kilometers and the population is about 27 million, of whom approximately 19 million are citizens.  The foreign population in the country, including many undocumented migrants, may exceed 12 million. Comprehensive statistics for the religious denominations of foreigners are not available, but they include Muslims from the various branches and schools of Islam, Christians (including Eastern Orthodox, Protestants, and Roman Catholics), Jews, more than 250,000 Hindus, more than 70,000 Buddhists, approximately 45,000 Sikhs, and others.

Accurate religious demographics of citizens are difficult to obtain. A majority of Saudi citizens are Salafi Muslims, and the strict interpretation of Islam taught by the Salafi or Wahhabi (historically known as Sufyani in early Islam but now named as Salafi) sect is the only officially recognized religion. A minority of citizens are Shia Muslims. In 2006, they formed around 15% of the native population.  They live mostly in the eastern districts on the Persian Gulf (Qatif, Al-Hasa, Dammam), where they constitute approximately three-quarters of the native population, and in the western highlands of Arabia (districts of Jazan, Najran, Asir, Medina, Ta'if, and Hijaz). Muslims leaving Islam (apostasy) is punishable by death under the version of Islamic law adopted by the country, but,  there had been no confirmed reports of executions for apostasy in recent years, but the possibility of extrajudicial executions still remains. According to a Gallup poll, 19% of Saudis are not religious and 5% are atheists.

Status of religious freedom
Saudi Arabia is an Islamic theocracy and the government has declared the Qur'an and the Sunnah (tradition) of Muhammad to be the country’s Constitution. Freedom of religion is not illegal, but spreading the religion is illegal. Islam is the official religion. Under the law, children born to Muslim fathers are also Muslim, regardless of the country or the religious tradition in which they have been raised. The government prohibits the public practice of other religions but the government generally allows private practice of non-Muslim religions.
The primary source of law in Saudi Arabia is based on Sharia (Islamic law), with Shari'a courts basing their judgments largely on a code derived from the Qur'an and the Sunnah. Additionally, traditional tribal law and custom remain significant.

The only national holidays observed in Saudi Arabia are the two Eids, Eid Al-Fitr at the end of Ramadan and Eid Al-Adha at the conclusion of the Hajj and the Saudi national day. Contrary practices, such as celebrating Maulid Al-Nabi (birthday of the Prophet Muhammad) and visits to the tombs of renowned Muslims, are forbidden, although enforcement was more relaxed in some communities than in others, and Shi'a were permitted to observe Ashura publicly in some communities.

Restrictions on religious freedom

Islamic practice generally is limited to that of a school of the Sunni branch of Islam as interpreted by Muhammad ibn Abd al Wahhab, an 18th-century Arab religious scholar. Outside Saudi Arabia, this branch of Islam is often referred to as "Wahhabi," a term the Saudis do not use.

Practices contrary to this interpretation, such as celebration of Muhammad's birthday and visits to the tombs of renowned Muslims, are discouraged. The spreading of Muslim teachings not in conformity with the officially accepted interpretation of Islam is prohibited. Writers and other individuals who publicly criticize this interpretation, including both those who advocate a stricter interpretation and those who favor a more moderate interpretation than the government's, have reportedly been imprisoned and faced other reprisals.

The Ministry of Islamic Affairs supervises and finances the construction and maintenance of almost all mosques in the country, although over 30% of all mosques in Saudi Arabia are built and endowed by private persons. The Ministry pays the salaries of imams (prayer leaders) and others who work in the mosques. A governmental committee defines the qualifications of imams. The CPVPV, "religious police", or Mutawwa'in is a government entity, and its chairman has ministerial status. The Committee sends out armed and unarmed people into the public to ensure that Saudi citizens and expatriates living in the kingdom follow the Islamic mores, at least in public.

Saudi law prohibits alcoholic beverages and pork products in the country as they are considered to be against Islam. Those violating the law are handed harsh punishments. Drug trafficking is always punished by death.

Under Saudi law conversion by a Muslim to another religion is considered apostasy, a crime punishable by death. 
In March 2014, the Saudi interior ministry issued a royal decree branding all atheists as terrorists, which defines terrorism as "calling for atheist thought in any form, or calling into question the fundamentals of the Islamic religion on which this country is based."

Non-Muslims are also strictly banned by Saudi Arabia from the Holy Cities of Mecca and Medina. On highways, religious police officers may divert them or hand out a fine. In the cities themselves, road checks are randomly conducted.

Saudi Arabia prohibits public non-Muslim religious activities. Non-Muslim worshipers risk arrest, imprisonment, lashing, deportation, and sometimes torture for engaging in overt religious activity that attracts official attention. In July 2012 the Bodu Bala Sena, an extremist Buddhist organization based in Sri Lanka, reported that Premanath Pereralage Thungasiri, a Sri Lankan Buddhist employed in Saudi Arabia, had been arrested for worshiping the Buddha in his employer's home, and that plans were being made to behead him. The Sri Lankan Embassy has rejected these reports. In the past, Sri Lankan officials have also rejected reports regarding labor conditions issued by New York-based Human Rights Watch.

The government has stated publicly, including before the U.N. Committee on Human Rights in Geneva, that its policy is to protect the right of non-Muslims to worship privately. However, non-Muslim organizations have claimed that there are no explicit guidelines for distinguishing between public and private worship, such as the number of persons permitted to attend and the types of locations that are acceptable. Such lack of clarity, as well as instances of arbitrary enforcement by the authorities, obliges most non-Muslims to worship in such a manner as to avoid discovery. Those detained for non-Muslim worship almost always are deported by authorities after sometimes lengthy periods of arrest during investigation. In some cases, they also are sentenced to receive lashes prior to deportation.

The government does not permit non-Muslim clergy to enter the country for the purpose of conducting religious services, although some come under other auspices and perform religious functions in secret. Such restrictions make it very difficult for most non-Muslims to maintain contact with clergymen and attend services. Catholics and Orthodox Christians, who require a priest on a regular basis to receive the sacraments required by their faith, particularly are affected.

Proselytizing by non-Muslims, including the distribution of non-Muslim religious materials such as Bibles, is illegal.  Muslims or non-Muslims wearing religious symbols of any kind in public risk confrontation with the Mutawwa'in. Under the auspices of the Ministry of Islamic Affairs, approximately 50 "Call and Guidance" centers employing approximately 500 persons work to convert foreigners to Islam. Some non-Muslim foreigners convert to Islam during their stay in the country. The press often carries articles about such conversions, including testimonials. The press as well as government officials publicized the conversion of the Italian Ambassador to Saudi Arabia, Torquato Cardilli, in late 2001.

The government requires noncitizen residents to carry a Saudi residence permit (Iqama) for identification in place of their passports.
Among other information, these contain a religious designation for "Muslim" or "non-Muslim."

Members of the Shi’a minority are the subjects of officially sanctioned political and economic discrimination. The authorities permit the celebration of the Shi’a holiday of Ashura in the eastern province city of Qatif, provided that the celebrants do not undertake large, public marches or engage in self-flagellation (a traditional Shi’a practice). The celebrations are monitored by the police. In 2002 observance of Ashura took place without incident in Qatif. No other Ashura celebrations are permitted in the country, and many Shi’a travel to Qatif or to Bahrain to participate in Ashura celebrations. The government continued to enforce other restrictions on the Shi’a community, such as banning Shi’a books

Shi’a have declined government offers to build state-supported mosques because they fear the government would prohibit the incorporation and display of Shi’a motifs in any such mosques. The government seldom permits private construction of Shi’a mosques. Virtually all existing mosques in al-Ahsa were unable to obtain licenses and faced the threat of closure at any time and in other parts of the country were not allowed to build Shia-specific mosques.

Members of the Shi’a minority are discriminated against in government employment, especially with respect to positions that relate to national security, such as in the military or in the Ministry of the Interior. The government restricts employment of Shi’a in the oil and petrochemical industries. The government also discriminates against Shi’a in higher education through unofficial restrictions on the number of Shi’a admitted to universities.

Under the provisions of Shari’a law as practiced in the country, judges may discount the testimony of people who are not practicing Muslims or who do not adhere to the official interpretation of Islam. Legal sources report that testimony by Shi’a is often ignored in courts of law or is deemed to have less weight than testimony by Sunnis. Sentencing under the legal system is not uniform. Laws and regulations state that defendants should be treated equally; however, under Shari’a as interpreted and applied in the country, crimes against Muslims may result in harsher penalties than those against non-Muslims. Information regarding government practices was generally incomplete because judicial proceedings usually were not publicized or were closed to the public, despite provisions in the criminal procedure law requiring court proceedings to be open.

Customs officials regularly open postal material and cargo to search for non-Muslim materials, such as Bibles and religious videotapes. Such materials are subject to confiscation.

Islamic religious education is mandatory in public schools at all levels. All public school children receive religious instruction that conforms with the official version of Islam. Non-Muslim students in private schools are not required to study Islam. Private religious schools are permitted for non-Muslims or for Muslims adhering to unofficial interpretations of Islam.

In 2007, Saudi religious police detained Shiite pilgrims participating in the Hajj and Umrah pilgrimage, allegedly calling them "infidels in Mecca and Medina"

The United States Commission on International Religious Freedom (USCIRF) in its 2019 report named Saudi Arabia as one of the world’s worst violators of religious freedom.

Ahmadiyya

Ahmadis are persecuted in Saudi Arabia on an ongoing basis. Although there are many foreign workers and Saudi citizens belonging to the Ahmadiyya sect in Saudi Arabia, Ahmadis are officially banned from entering the country and from performing the Hajj and Umrah pilgrimage to Mecca and Medina.

Blasphemy and apostasy

Saudi Arabia has criminal statutes making it illegal for a Muslim to change religion or to renounce Islam, which is defined as apostasy and punishable by death. For this reason, Saudi Arabia is known as 'the hell for apostates', with many ex-Muslims seeking to leave or flee the country before their non-belief is discovered, and living pseudonymous second lives on the Internet.

On 3 September 1992, Sadiq 'Abdul-Karim Malallah was publicly beheaded in Al-Qatif in Saudi Arabia's Eastern Province after being convicted of apostasy and blasphemy. Sadiq Malallah, a Shi'a Muslim from Saudi Arabia, was arrested in April 1988 and charged with throwing stones at a police patrol. He was reportedly held in solitary confinement for long periods during his first months in detention and tortured prior to his first appearance before a judge in July 1988. The judge reportedly asked him to convert from Shi'a Islam to Sunni Wahhabi Islam, and allegedly promised him a lighter sentence if he complied. After he refused to do so, he was taken to al-Mabahith al-'Amma (General Intelligence) Prison in Dammam where he was held until April 1990. He was then transferred to al-Mabahith al-'Amma Prison in Riyadh, where he remained until the date of his execution. Sadiq Malallah is believed to have been involved in efforts to secure improved rights for Saudi Arabia's Shi'a Muslim minority.

In 1994, Hadi Al-Mutif a teenager who was a Shi’a Ismaili Muslim from Najran in southwestern Saudi Arabia, made a remark that a court deemed blasphemous and was sentenced to death for apostasy. , he was still in prison, had alleged physical abuse and mistreatment during his years of incarceration, and had reportedly made numerous suicide attempts.

In 2012, Saudi poet and journalist Hamza Kashgari became the subject of a major controversy after being accused of insulting Muslim prophet Mohammad in three short messages (tweets) published on the Twitter online social networking service.  King Abdullah ordered that Kashgari be arrested "for crossing red lines and denigrating religious beliefs in God and His Prophet."

Ahmad Al Shamri from the town of Hafar al-Batin, was arrested on charges of atheism and blasphemy after allegedly using social media to state that he renounced Islam and the Prophet Mohammed, he was sentenced to death in February 2015.

In January 2019, 18-year-old Rahaf Mohammed fled Saudi Arabia after having renounced Islam and being abused by her family. On her way to Australia, she was held by Thai authorities in Bangkok while her father tried to take her back, but Rahaf managed to use social media to attract significant attention to her case. After diplomatic intervention, she was eventually granted asylum in Canada, where she arrived and settled soon after.

Witchcraft and sorcery

Saudi Arabia uses the death penalty for crimes of sorcery and witchcraft and claims that it is doing so in "public interest".

Saudi practices as "religious apartheid"

Testifying before the U.S. Congressional Human Rights Caucus on June 4, 2002, in a briefing entitled "Human Rights in Saudi Arabia: The Role of Women", Ali Al-Ahmed, Director of the Saudi Institute, stated:
Saudi Arabia is a glaring example of religious apartheid. The religious institutions from government clerics to judges, to religious curricula, and all religious instructions in media are restricted to the Wahhabi understanding of Islam, adhered to by less than 40% of the population. The Saudi government communized Islam, through its monopoly of both religious thoughts and practice. Wahhabi Islam is imposed and enforced on all Saudis regardless of their religious orientations. The Wahhabi sect does not tolerate other religious or ideological beliefs, Muslim or not. Religious symbols by Muslims, Christians, Jews and other believers are all banned. The Saudi embassy in Washington is a living example of religious apartheid. In its 50 years, there has not been a single non-Sunni Muslim diplomat in the embassy. The branch of Imam Mohamed Bin Saud University in Fairfax, Virginia instructs its students that Shia Islam is a Jewish conspiracy.

In 2003, Amir Taheri quoted a Shi'ite businessman from Dhahran as saying "It is not normal that there are no Shi'ite army officers, ministers, governors, mayors and ambassadors in this kingdom. This form of religious apartheid is as intolerable as was apartheid based on race."

In 2007, Saudi religious police detained Shiite pilgrims participating in the Hajj and Umrah pilgrimage, allegedly calling them "infidels in Mecca and Medina".

Until March 1, 2004, the official government website stated that Jews were forbidden from entering the country.  Prejudice against Jews is fairly high in the kingdom.  While the webpage has been modified, no one who admits to be Jewish, on the visa paperwork or has an Israeli government stamp on their passport is allowed in the kingdom.

Alan Dershowitz wrote in 2002, "in Saudi Arabia apartheid is practiced against non-Muslims, with signs indicating that Muslims must go to certain areas and non-Muslims to others."

On 14 December 2005, Republican Representative Ileana Ros-Lehtinen and Democratic Representative Shelley Berkley introduced a bill in Congress urging American divestiture from Saudi Arabia, and giving as its rationale (among other things) "Saudi Arabia is a country that practices religious apartheid and continuously subjugates its citizenry, both Muslim and non-Muslim, to a specific interpretation of Islam." Freedom House showed on its website, on a page tiled "Religious apartheid in Saudi Arabia", a picture of a sign showing Muslim-only and non-Muslim roads.

In 2007, there were news reports that according to Saudi policy for tourists it was not permissible to bring non-Muslim religious symbols and books into the kingdom as they were subject to confiscation, and that the U.S. State Department disputed this, saying that the regulation restrictions were no longer in place. The 2007 U.S The U.S State Department International Religious Freedom (IRF) report detailed several cases in which bibles were confiscated in Saudi Arabia, but said that there were fewer reports in 2007 of government officials confiscating religious materials than in previous years and no reports that customs officials had confiscated religious materials from travelers. In 2011, as in prior years, the Commission for the Promotion of Virtue and Prevention of Vice (CPVPV) and security forces of the Ministry of Interior (MOI) conducted some raids on private non-Muslim religious gatherings and sometimes confiscated the personal religious materials of non-Muslims. There were no reports in 2011 that customs officials confiscated religious materials from travelers, whether Muslims or non-Muslims. The 2013 IRF report also reports no confiscation of bibles, and stated:

2006 Freedom House Report
According to Freedom House's 2006 report:

Forced religious conversion

Forced conversion, as per the principles of Islam is not allowed

In July 2012, two men who had evangelized a young woman who subsequently converted to Christianity were arrested in the Saudi Gulf city Al-Khabar, on charges of "forcible conversion". The girl's father had laid charges against the two men after he failed to convince the young woman to return home from Lebanon and abandon her new faith.

See also
 Human rights in Saudi Arabia
 Religion in Saudi Arabia
 Wahhabism

References

External links
 Religious Freedom and the Middle East at The Washington Institute for Near East Policy PolicyWatch
 Does Saudi Arabia Preach Intolerance in the West?
 Center for Democracy and Human Rights in Saudi Arabia

Religion in Saudi Arabia
Saudi Arabia articles needing attention
Law of Saudi Arabia
Human rights abuses in Saudi Arabia
Saudi Arabia